Josip Sobin (born August 31, 1989) is a Croatian professional basketball player for Anwil Włocławek of the Polish Basketball League. Standing at 2.04 m, he plays at the power forward and center positions.

Professional career
Sobin grew up in KK Split and made his pro debut with the team in 2006. During the 2008–09 season he was loaned to KK Trogir competing in the top level Croatian basketball league. He spent three more seasons in Split playing in the Croatian League and the 2012–13 season in the Adriatic League also (9.3 pts, 5.0 rbs, 1.2 ass). After the club suffered a financial breakdown, in September 2013 he signed a three-year contract with Zadar. In December 2014, he was named the ABA League MVP of the month. In June 2015, he left Zadar due to the financial problems of the club. In July 2015, he signed with Spanish club Fuenlabrada for the 2015–16 season. On June 30, 2016, he signed with Polish club Anwil Włocławek. In June 2018 he signed another one-year contract with the same team.

On September 19, 2019, he has signed with Vanoli Cremona of the Italian Lega Basket Serie A (LBA). 

On June 21, 2020, he signed with Stal Ostrów Wielkopolski of the Polish Basketball League (PLK).

On June 12, 2021, he has signed with MKS Dąbrowa Górnicza of the Polish Basketball League (PLK).

On July 29, 2022, he has signed with Anwil Włocławek of the Polish Basketball League.

Personal life
His father Goran Sobin, was also a basketball player and a two-time winner of the European Cup (1989, 1990) with Jugoplastika. His cousin, Slavko Sobin, is an actor.

References

External links
 Profile at aba-liga.com
 Profile at acb.com
 Profile at eurobasket.com
 Profile at fiba.com

1989 births
Living people
ABA League players
Baloncesto Fuenlabrada players
Basketball players from Split, Croatia
Centers (basketball)
Croatian expatriate basketball people in Spain
Croatian men's basketball players
KK Split players
KK Włocławek players
KK Zadar players
Lega Basket Serie A players
Liga ACB players
MKS Dąbrowa Górnicza (basketball) players
Stal Ostrów Wielkopolski players
Vanoli Cremona players